The American Choral Directors Association (ACDA), headquartered in Oklahoma City, Oklahoma, is a non-profit organization with the stated purpose of promoting excellence in the field of choral music.  Its membership comprises approximately 22,000 choral directors representing over a million singers.

Background information
ACDA is organized in six Regions, i.e., Midwestern, Eastern, Northwestern, Southern, Southwestern, and Western.  Every year, conferences with topics pertaining to choral conductors are held - in even numbered years, a region conference is held in each region, and in odd numbered years, a national conference takes place in a major U.S. city.  In 2009, ACDA celebrated its 50th Anniversary in Oklahoma City; in 2011, the national conference was held in Chicago, Illinois. The 2013 national conference was held in Dallas, Texas. In 2021, ACDA organized its first virtual national conference in response to the COVID-19 pandemic. In 2023, the organization returned to an in person conference, with Cincinnati serving as the host city. James Madison University was the host for the national chapter for 2011.  Each year a different university hosts the yearly ACDA chapter.

Conductors can apply to have their choirs perform at these conferences through a blind audition-CD process.  Being accepted to sing at an ACDA conference is considered a great honor, both for a choir and for its conductor.  Individual singers may also apply to sing with ACDA National or Regional Honor Choirs.  About 300 singers are selected from around the country to sing in each national or regional choir.

Their official publications are the Choral Journal, as well as the scientific research journal International Journal of Research in Choral Singing (online only).

Robyn Hilger is the current executive director.

In addition to the division organization, a similar break out is done along specialization
lines.  The specialties are:
Boychoirs  
Children's Choirs  
College and University Choirs  
Community Choirs 
Ethnic and Multicultural Perspectives  
Jazz Choirs  
Junior High & Middle School Choirs  
Male Choirs  
Music in Worship  
Show Choirs  
Senior High School Choirs  
Two-Year College Choirs  
Women's Choirs  
Youth & Student Activities

Each specialty is organized under a Repertoire and Standards (R&S) Committee system, with a National Committee, Division Committees, and State chairpersons.  The National Chairperson for each specialty is also a member of the National R&S Committee which meets annually to discuss issues common to all specialties.

Brock Commission 
Since 1991, the ACDA awards the "Raymond W. Brock Memorial Commission" to "a recognized composer to write a choral composition in an effort to perpetuate quality choral repertoire."

See also
 John B. Haberlen, a past national President of the Association

References

External links
Official site
International Journal of Research in Choral Singing

Music education organizations
Vocal and choral music organizations
Choral conductors
Music organizations based in the United States
Music education in the United States
Arts organizations based in Oklahoma
Organizations based in Oklahoma City